Wan Long (born 1940) is a Chinese billionaire businessman, the chairman and CEO of WH Group, the world's largest pork company, with subsidiaries including Smithfield Foods in the US.

Early life
Wan Long was born in China.

Career
In 1968 Wan Long started work for Luohe Meat Products Processing United Factory, and became the factory's general manager in 1984.

Wan Long is the chairman of WH Group, the world's largest pork company, with subsidiaries including Smithfield Foods in the US. Wan Long has been chairman since November 2010, and CEO since October 2013.

Personal life
Wan Long lives in Luohe, China.

References

1940 births
Living people
People from Luohe
Chinese billionaires
Businesspeople from Henan
Chinese food industry businesspeople